Luengo is a Spanish surname. Notable people with the surname include:

Antton Luengo (born 1981), Spanish cyclist
Beatriz Luengo (born 1982), Spanish singer-songwriter and actress
Iván Luengo (born 2003), Spanish actor
Jorge Luengo (born 1984), Spanish magician
José María Luengo Martínez (1896–1991), Spanish writer and archaeologist
Maider Luengo (born 1980), Spanish field hockey player
Maria Teresa Luengo (born 1940), Argentine classical composer and musicologist
Sharon Luengo (born 1971), Venezuelan beauty pageant winner
Víctor Luengo (born 1974), Spanish basketball player

Spanish-language surnames